"Alloyed" is the eighth and final episode of the first season of the American fantasy television series The Lord of the Rings: The Rings of Power, based on the novel The Lord of the Rings and its appendices by J. R. R. Tolkien. Set in the Second Age of Middle-earth, thousands of years before Tolkien's The Hobbit and The Lord of the Rings, it depicts the forging of the three Elven Rings of Power. The episode was written by Gennifer Hutchison and showrunners J. D. Payne and Patrick McKay, and directed by Wayne Che Yip.

Amazon made a multi-season commitment for a new The Lord of the Rings series in November 2017. Payne and McKay were set to develop it in July 2018. Filming for the first season took place in New Zealand, and work on episodes beyond the first two began in January 2021. Yip was revealed to be directing four episodes of the season that March, including the eighth episode. Production wrapped for the season in August 2021.

"Alloyed" premiered on the streaming service Amazon Prime Video on September 16, 2022. It was estimated to have high viewership and received generally positive reviews.

Plot 
The Harfoots Nori Brandyfoot, Poppy Proudfellow, Marigold Brandyfoot, and Sadoc Burrows search for the stranger, their friend, in the Greenwood, but he is first found by a trio of mysterious women known as the Dweller, the Nomad, and the Ascetic. They tell him that he is their Lord Sauron, and plan to restore his memories and power.

In Eregion, the Elven smith Celebrimbor believes they do not have enough of the ore mithril to counteract the fading of Elven power in Middle-earth. As he and Elrond prepare to inform High King Gil-galad, Galadriel arrives with the gravely injured human Halbrand, the King of the Southlands. As Halbrand begins to recover, he grows interested in Celebrimbor's work and suggests a way to create one small object with the mithril they have that would have power of both the seen and unseen world. Gil-galad is against the idea, but Galadriel convinces him that it is worth try. Still, she grows suspicious of Halbrand and asks for records on his lineage.

With the King of Númenór, Tar-Palantir, growing ill, Chancellor Pharazôn organizes for members of the Builder's Guild to begin designing a tomb. Apprentice Eärien is given an hour by the king's bed to plan a design, during which the king awakes and mistakes her for his daughter, the Queen Regent Míriel. He leads her up his tower to a palantir (crystal ball) and warns her not to look in it for too long. The king dies soon after, before Míriel and Eärien's father Elendil return from Middle-earth.

The Harfoots find the stranger and attempt to rescue him from the women, but they kill Sadoc and nearly kill the others. The stranger, regaining his memories and receiving encouragement from Nori, uses the magic staff of the Dweller to reveal the dark true forms of the women banish them back to the unseen world. Before they go, they realize that he is not Sauron but rather an Istar. Nori, Marigold, and Poppy return with the stranger to the other Harfoots where he explains that Istar means Wizards, and he needs to travel east to the land of Rhûn to learn more about his powers and purpose. With the encouragement of her family, Nori goes with him.

Halbrand and Celebrimbor work together to combine mithril with other elements and decide that they will need two small, circular objects. Galadriel receives records on the Kings of the Southlands and realizes that Halbrand is not who he says he is. She confronts him and he reveals himself to be the Dark Lord Sauron in disguise. He tells her that he has been telling her the truth of his intentions all along, and asks her to join him as a Dark Queen to rule Middle-earth with. She refuses and he almost drowns her before fleeing to Mordor. She chooses not to reveal this information to Celebrimbor and Elrond, instead encouraging them to move forward with their plan but with three objects instead of two ("one will corrupt, two will divide, but with three there is balance"). Elrond finds the records and deduces what happened, but too late: three Rings of Power are forged.

Production

Development 
Amazon acquired the global television rights for J. R. R. Tolkien's The Lord of the Rings in November 2017. The company's streaming service, Amazon Prime Video, gave a multi-season commitment to a series based on the novel and its appendices, to be produced by Amazon Studios. It was later titled The Lord of the Rings: The Rings of Power. Amazon hired J. D. Payne and Patrick McKay to develop the series and serve as showrunners in July 2018. Gennifer Hutchison had joined the series as a writer by July 2019, and Wayne Che Yip was revealed to be directing four episodes of the first season in March 2021. The series is set in the Second Age of Middle-earth, thousands of years before the events of Tolkien's The Hobbit and The Lord of the Rings, and the first season focuses on introducing the setting and major heroic characters to the audience. Written by Hutchison, Payne, and McKay, and directed by Yip, the eighth episode is titled "Alloyed".

Casting 

The series' large cast includes Cynthia Addai-Robinson as Míriel, Robert Aramayo as Elrond, Morfydd Clark as Galadriel, Charles Edwards as Celebrimbor, Trystan Gravelle as Pharazôn, Lenny Henry as Sadoc Burrows, Ema Horvath as Eärien, Markella Kavenagh as Elanor "Nori" Brandyfoot, Lloyd Owen as Elendil, Megan Richards as Poppy Proudfellow, Dylan Smith as Largo Brandyfoot, Charlie Vickers as Halbrand, Leon Wadham as Kemen, Benjamin Walker as Gil-galad, Daniel Weyman as the Stranger, and Sara Zwangobani as Marigold Brandyfoot. Also starring are Ken Blackburn as Tar-Palantir, Alex Tarrant as Valandil, Will Fletcher as Finrod, Thusitha Jayasundera as Malva, Maxine Cunliffe as Vilma, Beau Cassidy as Dilly Brandyfoot, Bridie Sisson as the Dweller, Edith Poor as the Nomad, and Kali Kopae as the Ascetic.

Filming 
Amazon confirmed in September 2019 that filming for the first season would take place in New Zealand, where the Lord of the Rings and Hobbit film trilogies were made. Filming primarily took place at Kumeu Film Studios and Auckland Film Studios in Auckland, under the working title Untitled Amazon Project or simply UAP. Production on episodes beyond the first two began in January 2021, and Yip confirmed that he had begun filming his episodes by March. Filming for the season wrapped on August 2.

Visual effects 
Visual effects for the episode were created by Industrial Light & Magic (ILM), Wētā FX, Method Studios, Rodeo FX, DNEG, Outpost VFX, Cause and FX, Atomic Arts, and Cantina Creative. The different vendors were overseen by visual effects supervisor Jason Smith. Cause and FX contributed to various effects throughout the season, and were then entrusted with the final scene in which Sauron enters Mordor. The company created a digital matte painting of the Mordor environment, added effects for the erupting Mount Doom and general atmosphere, and then combined those with the live-action elements to complete the sequence.

Outpost VFX was responsible for the forging of the rings, and looked at a lot of references for molten metal and different liquids combining. They were able to see the series' title announcement video, which features macro photography of real molten metal being poured, before it was officially released. For shots where the camera movement was motivated by the pouring of molten metal, the actors had been filmed pouring shampoo. Other shots were filmed with no reference liquid. Outpost visual effects supervisor Richard Clegg said a challenge of making digital molten metal look realistic was getting the interaction of light correct because the metal is a light source itself but also forms a crust that other light interacts with. He also said the addition of mithril to the molten metal was difficult to make realistic due to being a magical process; they noticed that when it is first added the mithril forms a shape similar to the Eye of Sauron, and there were discussions about how much to lean into that versus keeping it subtle. The company augmented the scene with coals and flames, and adjusted the practical lighting to more correctly show the high exposure on the camera that the molten metal would create. Three artists worked on the 20-shot sequence for two months, which Clegg said was not much time for such complex work.

Music 

A soundtrack album featuring composer Bear McCreary's score for the episode was released on Amazon Music on October 14, 2022. McCreary said the album contained "virtually every second of score" from the episode. It was added to other music streaming services after the full first season was released. Additionally, a version of the song "Where the Shadows Lie", which McCreary composed as a theme for his score using the text of the "Ring Verse" from Tolkien's The Lord of the Rings, is heard during the end credits. Sung by Fiona Apple, the song was added to the season album when the episode was released. All music composed by Bear McCreary:

Release 
"Alloyed" premiered on Prime Video in the United States on October 14, 2022. It was released at the same time around the world, in more than 240 countries and territories.

Reception

Viewership 
Software company Whip Media, who track viewership data for the 21 million worldwide users of their TV Time app, calculated that for the week ending October 16, two days after the episode's debut, The Rings of Power remained the second-highest original streaming series for U.S. viewership, behind Disney+'s She-Hulk: Attorney at Law. JustWatch, a guide to streaming content with access to data from more than 20 million users around the world, placed it third on their list of top 10 streaming series in the U.S. for the week ending October 16. Nielsen Media Research, who record streaming viewership on U.S. television screens, estimated that the series was watched for 1.1 billion minutes during the week ending October 16. This was an increase with the finale's release, moving the series up to second-place on the company's list of top streaming series and films, behind only Netflix's The Watcher. Parrot Analytics determines audience "demand expressions" based on various data sources, including social media activity and comments on rating platforms. During the week ending October 21, the company calculated that The Rings of Power was 43.4 times more in demand than the average U.S. streaming series, a 10 percent increase that moved it up to second on the company's top 10 list for the week.

Critical response 

The review aggregator website Rotten Tomatoes reported an 84% approval rating with an average score of 8.0/10 based on 25 reviews. The website's critics consensus reads: "The Rings of Power central mystery is finally answered in 'Alloyed', a finale that is by turns sumptuous and staid while hinting at a more propulsive story to come."

Accolades

Companion media 
An episode of the official aftershow Deadline's Inside the Ring: LOTR: The Rings of Power for "The Great Wave" was released on October 15, 2022. Hosted by Deadline Hollywood Dominic Patten and Anthony D'Alessandro, it features exclusive "footage and insights" for the episode, plus interviews with Vickers, Payne, McKay, executive producer Lindsey Weber, Yip, and McCreary. On October 14, The Official The Lord of the Rings: The Rings of Power Podcast was released on Amazon Music. Hosted by actress Felicia Day, the eighth episode is dedicated to "Alloyed" and features Payne and McKay. On November 21, a bonus segment featuring behind-the-scenes footage from the episode was added to Prime Video's X-Ray feature as part of a series titled "The Making of The Rings of Power".

References

External links 
 

2022 American television episodes
The Lord of the Rings: The Rings of Power